Jennifer Mucino-Fernandez (born December 18, 2002) is an American archer. Mucino-Fernandez was born in Boston and raised in Mexico City. She competed in the women's individual event at the 2020 Summer Olympics.

References

External links
 

2002 births
Living people
American female archers
Olympic archers of the United States
Archers at the 2020 Summer Olympics
Place of birth missing (living people)
Sportspeople from Boston
Sportspeople from Mexico City
21st-century American women